Padiyanoor Sree Chamundi Devi Temple or Padiyanoor Devi Temple is a Hindu temple dedicated to Goddess Chamundi  located in Thiruvananthapuram, India. This ancient temple, is situated at Poovachal, around 30 km from Thiruvananthapuram city. The temple enshrines an idol of the goddess Padiyanooramma – an incarnation of Chamundi.

Main Shrine

Chamundi Devi herself is considered a fierce form of Kali.

Other shrines

Though the cardinal deity is Chamundi Devi, Yakshiymma, Ganapati, Thampuran, Yogeshwara, Nagar and Brahmarakshas are also accommodated in the temple.

Makam Thozhal Festival
The annual festival is in the month of Meenam for 3 days.

Other festivals 
The other festivals in this temple are:

 Karthika - Karthika Deepa
 Mandala Vratham - Festival in connection with the annual Utsavam of Sabarimala
 Pooja Vaypu - Identical to Dussera festival (Saraswathy Pooja and Vidyarambham)
 Ayilya Pooja - Milk, flowers etc. offered to serpent God and special rites
 Aiswarya Pooja - On all full moon (Pournami) days
 Vishu Kani - On the first day of the month of Medam people come here for the Vishukani Darshanam.

Transportation

Poovachal is just 30 km from Thiruvananthapuram city. The nearest airport is Trivandrum International Airport. The nearest railway station is Trivandrum Central Railway Station and the nearest bus station is Kattakada Bus Station.

Those who travel via Kattakada on reaching Poovachal Mulammoodu junction should take the right turn via Kurakonam to the temple.

See also
 Temples of Kerala

References 

Hindu temples in Thiruvananthapuram district
Devi temples in Kerala